Melaleuca brophyi is a plant in the myrtle family, Myrtaceae and is endemic to the south-west of Western Australia. It is a small to medium-sized shrub with small, fleshy leaves and clusters of fruit that resemble soccer balls.

Description
Its leaves are crowded, spirally arranged, fleshy, warty, almost circular in cross-section and have prominent oil glands.

As with other melaleucas, the stamens are in groups of five and in this species there are about three to six stamens per bundle.

Taxonomy and naming
The specific epithet (brophyi) is in recognition of the work of Joseph J. Brophy for his work on essential oils in the families Myrtaceae and Rutaceae.

Distribution and habitat
This melaleuca occurs between Southern Cross, Norseman and Esperance in the Avon Wheatbelt, Esperance Plains and Mallee biogeographic regions in Western Australia. It grows in black clay in saline, low-lying areas.

Conservation status
Melaleuca brophyi is classified as "not threatened" by the Government of Western Australia Department of Parks and Wildlife.

References

brophyi
Plants described in 1999
Endemic flora of Western Australia